Lipstick Powder and Paint is an album by Welsh rock and roll singer Shakin' Stevens, released in November 1985 by Epic Records. It peaked at number 37 on the UK Albums Chart.

Release
Only two singles were released from the album: the title track, a cover of Big Joe Turner's "Lipstick, Powder and Paint", and a cover of the Tim Krekel  song "Turning Away" (also covered by Crystal Gayle). Neither of these reached the Top-Ten in the UK, making it Stevens' first album since Take One! (1980) not to have a Top-Ten single. Despite this, in between the release of the two singles, Stevens released "Merry Christmas Everyone", which topped the charts.

Unlike with his previous album, The Bop Won't Stop, Epic decided not to release the album on CD, so it was not until the 2009 Epic Masters box set that the album was officially released on CD. The box set has several bonus tracks, including two singles, "Teardrops" and "Breaking Up My Heart", that had been released from Stevens' Greatest Hits album.

On both the original release and the box set, "Don't Lie to Me" is credited to Chuck Berry. However, the song, actually called "Don't You Lie to Me", was written and originally sung by Hudson Whittaker (under the name Tampa Red).

Reception
Reviewing for Number One, Karen Swayne wrote that the album "has the current hit, plus variations on the sanitised rock 'n' rolling theme. The lyrical concerns are good loving, bad loving and good loving gone bad, and Shaky puts about the same lack of emotion into each track." Swayne also wrote that Stevens' "legions of fans will buy this anyway, and defend him loyally to any non-believers."

Sally Gethin for Smash Hits was more positive about the album, giving it a six out of ten, and writing that Stevens' "may not be creaming off the catchiest numbers any more... but a new Shaky album is as warm and reliable as sinking into your favourite bubbly bath. Predictable melodies are crooned to perfection, upbeat party numbers dunked in that familiar Elvis Presley coating."

Track listing

2009 bonus tracks:

Personnel
Musicians
 Shakin' Stevens – vocals
 Ian Aitken – lead guitar
 Roger McKew – lead and rhythm guitar
 Dick Bland – bass guitar
 Chris Wyles – drums
 Frank Ricotti – percussion
 The Rumour Brass:
 Ray Beavis – tenor saxophone
 John "Irish" Earle – baritone and tenor saxophones
 Chris Gower – trombone
 Dick Hanson – trumpet
 Tony Rivers – backing vocals
 Stu Calver – backing vocals
 Mick Clarke – backing vocals
 John Perry – backing vocals
 Marilyn David – backing vocals (8)
 Sonia Jones – backing vocals (8)
 Tessa Niles – backing vocals (8)

Technical
 Carey Taylor – engineer
 Neill King – engineer (9, 10)
 Dave Edmunds – producer (all except 9, 10)
 Shakin' Stevens – executive producer, producer (9, 10)
 Bill Smith Studio – cover design
 Terence Donovan – photography
 Andrew Douglas – back cover photography

Charts

Certifications and sales

References

1985 albums
Epic Records albums
albums produced by Dave Edmunds
Shakin' Stevens albums